Le Collectionneur de cerveaux (Thinking Robots) is a French horror film (1976) based on George Langelaan's novel Les robots pensants starring Claude Jade

The young pianist Penny Vanderwood (Claude Jade) notices that a robot, created by the Count Saint-Germain (André Reybaz) plays chess the same way that her deceased fiancé Robert Tournon. She convinces her friend Lewis Armeight (François Dunoyer) to open the coffinof Robert, which is empty. Penny seeks to solve this mystery and embarks on the trail of Count ...

Fantastic story adapted from George Langelaan's "Thinking Robots" and which portrays the contemporary adventure of a chess-playing automaton. Alone on the stage of a provincial theater, the famous pianist Penny Vanderwood repeat her next piano recital. A Man between two ages broke into the theatre room and observe the young woman. As soon as she finished playing, he applauded at length, "I had long dreamed of inventing a pianist robot and when I saw you, I knew it would look like you." The Man leaves Penny his business card: "Count of St. Germain, creator of automatons." The day after her recital, Penny reads in bed in the flattering newspaper article dedicated to her. The attention of the girl is attracted to another article, pretty amazing, announcing championship that pits the best chess joureus of town to a mysterious and infallible robot presented by the Comte de Saint-Germain ... Intrigued, Penny decides to extend her stay to attend the tournament...

Films scored by Vladimir Cosma
1976 films
1970s French-language films